"It's You Again" is a song recorded by American country music group Exile.  It was released in September 1988 as the fourth single from the album Shelter from the Night.  The song reached #21 on the Billboard Hot Country Singles & Tracks chart.  The song was written by band members J.P. Pennington and Sonny LeMaire.

Chart performance

References

1988 singles
1987 songs
Exile (American band) songs
Songs written by Sonny LeMaire
Songs written by J.P. Pennington
Epic Records singles